Nero Marquina marble (mármol negro Marquina) is a high quality, black bituminous limestone extracted from the region of Markina, Basque Country in the North of Spain. This variety of marble gets its black color from naturally-occurring bitumen.

It is one of the most important marbles from Spain. It has a fine and compact grain with a black background and white veins, which can be abundant. It has gained recognition worldwide due to its beautiful black color.
Similar black marbles are now also produced in China and Iran.

References

Marble
Basque Country (autonomous community)
Mining in Spain